The 2004 USL Premier Development League season was the 10th PDL season. The season began in April 2004 and ended in August 2004.

Central Florida Kraze finished the season as national champions, beating Boulder Rapids Reserve 1–0 in the PDL Championship game. Chicago Fire Reserves finished with the best regular season record in the league, winning 17 out of their 18 games, suffering no losses, and finishing with a +66 goal difference. 

El Paso Patriots striker Julio Frias was the league's top scorer, with 25 goals, while DFW Tornados midfielder Mark Rowland led the league with 11 assists. Chicago Fire Reserves keeper Brad Guzan enjoyed the best goalkeeping statistics, with a goals-against average of 0.39 per game in his 13 games.

Changes from 2003

Name changes 
Louisiana Outlaws changed their name to Lafayette Swamp Cats.
Mid-Michigan Bucks changed their name to Michigan Bucks.
Texas Spurs changed their name to Dallas-Fort Worth Tornados.

New franchises 
Ten teams joined the league this year, including four brand new franchises:

Folding 
Five teams left the league prior to the beginning of the season:
Calgary Storm Prospects - Calgary, Alberta
Greenville Lions - Greenville, South Carolina
Houston Toros - Houston, Texas
Jersey Shore Boca - Toms River, New Jersey
Worcester Kings - Worcester, Massachusetts

Standings

Central Conference

Great Lakes Division

Heartland Division

Eastern Conference

Mid Atlantic Division

Northeast Division

Southern Conference

Mid South Division

Southeast Division

Western Conference

Northwest Division

Southwest Division

Playoffs

References

2004
4